Jabulani Ncubeni (born 18 December 1992) is a South African soccer player.

References

External links

1992 births
Association football midfielders
Living people
Sportspeople from Pietermaritzburg
South African soccer players
Maritzburg United F.C. players
Thanda Royal Zulu F.C. players
Lamontville Golden Arrows F.C. players
AmaZulu F.C. players
Bloemfontein Celtic F.C. players
Royal AM F.C. players
South African Premier Division players
National First Division players